is the debut studio album by Japanese singer-songwriter Marie Ueda. It was released on 25 February 2015 under Giza Studio label.

Background
The album includes previous 2 released singles, Kare ni Mamotte Hoshii 10 no Koto and Zakura no Mi. Some tracks of album, like "a girl" was composed during her indies times. The lead track of the album is "Friday". It was released in two formats: regular CD edition with 13 tracks included in and CD+DVD edition which includes music videoclips from years 2010 until 2014.

Charting
The album reached #45 rank first week. Album charted for 2 weeks.

Track listing
All songs are written and composed by Marie Ueda.

In media
Kare ni Mamotte Hoshii Juu no koto: as playable song for smartphone game Show By Rock!!
Friday: as theme song for Ezaki Glico's Collon

References

2015 debut albums
Being Inc. albums
Giza Studio albums
Japanese-language albums